Parinari is a genus of plant in the family Chrysobalanaceae.

Species of genus Parinari are found in Subsaharan Africa from Senegal to Sudan and Kenya and south to Namibia and Natal; in Eastern Madagascar; from Indochina through Indonesia, New Guinea, northern Queensland, and the southwest Pacific; and in Central and South America from Costa Rica to Trinidad and southern Brazil. The oldest fossils of Parinari fruits are from the early Miocene of Ethiopia, Panama, and Colombia.

The genus is closely related to Neocarya.

Parinari can be distinguished from other genera in Chrysobalanaceae by the following characteristics:
 zygomorphic floral symmetry
 6-10 unilaterally-attached stamens per flower
 ovary at side or mouth of receptacle-tube
 leaf lower surface lanate and with hair-filled stomatal cavities and parallel secondaries closely spaced
 pair of glands on leaf petiole
 large, woody fruits

Species
 The Plant List recognises 42 accepted species (including infraspecific names):

 Parinari alvimii  
 Parinari anamensis  – Annamese burada
 Parinari argenteo-sericea  
 Parinari brasiliensis  
 Parinari campestris  
 Parinari canarioides  
 Parinari capensis  – Dwarf mobola plum
 Parinari cardiophylla  
 Parinari chocoensis  
 Parinari congensis  
 Parinari congolana  
 Parinari costata  
 subsp. polyneura  
 subsp. rubiginosa  
 Parinari curatellifolia  – Mobola plum
 Parinari elmeri  
 Parinari excelsa  – Guinea plum
 Parinari gigantea  
 Parinari hypochrysea  
 Parinari insularum  
 Parinari klugii  
 Parinari leontopitheci  
 Parinari littoralis  
 Parinari maguirei  
 Parinari metallica  
 Parinari montana  
 Parinari nonda  – Nonda plum
 Parinari oblongifolia  
 Parinari obtusifolia  
 Parinari occidentalis  
 Parinari pachyphylla 
 Parinari panamensis 
 Parinari papuana  
 subsp. salomonensis  
 Parinari parilis  
 Parinari parva  
 Parinari parvifolia  
 Parinari prancei  
 Parinari rigida  
 Parinari rodolphii  
 Parinari romeroi  
 Parinari sprucei  
 Parinari sumatrana

References

 
Chrysobalanaceae genera
Taxonomy articles created by Polbot